Early Gold  is a compilation album of Simple Minds early material, released in 2003. It contains songs from years 1979-1982.

Track listing
All tracks by Charlie Burchill, Derek Forbes, Jim Kerr, Brian McGee & Mick MacNeil except where noted.

"Life in a Day" (Burchill, Kerr) – 4:07
"Chelsea Girl" (Burchill, Kerr) – 4:34
"Changeling" – 4:12
"Factory" – 4:15
"Premonition" – 5:30
"I Travel" – 4:02
"Celebrate" – 5:08
"Thirty Frames a Second" – 5:05
"The American" – 3:51
"Love Song" – 5:04
"Sweat in Bullet" – 4:30
"Promised You a Miracle" (Burchill, Forbes, Kerr, McNeil) – 4:28
"Glittering Prize" (Burchill, Forbes, Kerr, McNeil) – 4:34
"Someone Somewhere in Summertime"(Burchill, Forbes, Kerr, McNeil) – 4:35
"New Gold Dream" (Burchill, Forbes, Kerr, McNeil) – 5:39

Personnel
 Charlie Burchill – guitar, keyboards
 Derek Forbes – bass guitar
 Jim Kerr – lead vocals
 Brian McGee – drums
 Mick MacNeil – keyboards

References 

Albums produced by John Leckie
Albums produced by Steve Hillage
2003 compilation albums
Simple Minds compilation albums
Virgin Records compilation albums